The relations between Denmark and Sweden span a long history of interaction. The inhabitants of each speak related North Germanic languages, which have a degree of mutual intelligibility. Both countries formed part of the Kalmar Union between 1397 and 1523, but there exists an inherited cultural competition between Sweden and Denmark. From 1448 to 1790 the two kingdoms went to war against each other at nearly every opportunity; in more than one case a new king tried to prove his worth by waging war on the other country for little or no political reason. Eleven Dano-Swedish wars took place between 1521 and 1814.

Today, the countries are separated by the Øresund, which links the Baltic Sea and the North Sea. Denmark has an embassy in Stockholm and 2 consulates-general (in Gothenburg and Malmö). Sweden has an embassy in Copenhagen and 16 honorary consulates. Both countries are full members of the Nordic Council, of the Council of the Baltic Sea States, of the Council of Europe, and of the European Union. Around 21,000 Swedish people live in Denmark and around 42,000 Danish people live in Sweden.

Since Gustav Vasa consolidated the Swedish nation-state after the Swedish War of Liberation in 1523, Sweden and Denmark have fought 11 wars from the Northern Seven Years' War to the Napoleonic Wars. Sweden has historically won the majority of the wars, 7 of the total 11. Even though not all of these wars resulted in territorial changes and some ended in status quo, Sweden is considered victorious in many of these wars because they were triggered by Denmark. The Swedish Campaign against Norway in 1814 was Sweden’s last war with Denmark, unlike Denmark which was involved in the Schleswig wars.

Historic conflicts

Second Northern War

The Second Northern War (1655–60) was fought between Sweden and its adversaries the Polish–Lithuanian Commonwealth (1655–60), Russia (1656–58), Brandenburg-Prussia (1657–60), the Habsburg monarchy (1657–60) and Denmark–Norway (1657–58 and 1658–60). The Dutch Republic often intervened against Sweden.

In 1655, Karl X Gustav of Sweden invaded and occupied western Poland-Lithuania, the eastern half of which was already occupied by Russia. The rapid Swedish advance became known in Poland as Swedish Deluge. The Grand Duchy of Lithuania became a Swedish fief, the Polish-Lithuanian regular armies surrendered and the Polish king John II Casimir Vasa fled to the Habsburgs. Frederick William, Elector of Brandenburg and Duke of Prussia initially supported the estates in Royal Prussia, but allied with Sweden in return for receiving the Duchy of Prussia as a Swedish fief. Exploiting the hurt religious feelings of the Roman Catholic population under Protestant occupation and organizing Polish-Lithuanian military leaders in the Tyszowce Confederation, John II Casimir Vasa managed to regain ground in 1656. Russia took advantage of the Swedish setback, declared war on Sweden and pushed into Lithuania and Swedish Livonia.

Charles X Gustav then granted Frederick William I full sovereignty in the Duchy of Prussia in return for military aid, and in the Treaty of Radnot allied himself with the Transylvanian George II Rákóczi who invaded Poland-Lithuania from the southeast. John II Vasa found an ally in Leopold I of Habsburg, whose armies crossed into Poland-Lithuania from the southwest. This triggered Frederick III of Denmark's invasion of the Swedish mainland in the spring of 1657, in an attempt to settle old scores from the Torstenson War while Sweden was busy elsewhere. Brandenburg left the alliance with Sweden when granted full sovereignty in the Duchy of Prussia by the Polish king in the treaties of Wehlau and Bromberg.

Dano-Swedish War (1658–60)

The Dano-Swedish War of 1658–60 was a war between Denmark–Norway and Sweden. It was a continuation of an earlier conflict between the two belligerents which had ended just months earlier, after Sweden and Denmark brokered a peace agreement in Roskilde in 1658. In the aftermath of that conflict, the Swedish king Charles X Gustav desired to add the province of Royal Prussia in Poland to the Swedish realm, but his position in the region was not strong enough with the opposition of Brandenburg and Austria. However, the Danes stalled and prolonged the fulfillment of some provisions of the earlier peace; the Swedish king decided to use this as a pretext to attack with an ambitious goal: to vanquish Denmark as a sovereign state and raze the capital of Copenhagen. A quick and decisive defeat of Denmark was however only seen as a means to a greater end. The long-term goal was to wage war in Europe without fearing Danish interference.

Scanian War

The Scanian War was a part of the Northern Wars involving the union of Denmark–Norway, Brandenburg and Sweden. It was fought mainly on Scanian soil, in the former Danish provinces along the border with Sweden and in Northern Germany. While the latter battles are regarded a theater of the Scanian war in English, Danish and Swedish historiography, they are seen as a separate war in German historiography, called the Swedish-Brandenburgian War.

The war was prompted by the Swedish involvement in the Franco-Dutch War. Sweden had allied with France against several European countries. The United Provinces, under attack by France, sought support from Denmark–Norway. After some hesitation, King Christian V started the invasion of the Scania (Skåneland) in 1675, while the Swedish were occupied with a war against Brandenburg. The invasion of Scania was combined with a simultaneous Norwegian front called the Gyldenløve Wae, forcing the defending Swedes to fight a two-front war in addition to their entanglements in the Holy Roman Empire.

Cultural links

There are extensive cultural links between Denmark and Sweden, which are often referred to as "brotherfolks" (Danish/Swedish: broderfolk). The southern part of Sweden, Scania, was a part of Denmark until 1658, and the Scanian landscapes still contain many references to the Danish rule, such as in the name of many towns and cities, including Kristianstad. The construction of the Øresund Bridge has rekindled those ties, with the creation of the Øresund Region as the transnational metropolitan area comprising Copenhagen and Malmö. In addition, many Swedes and Danes consider themselves culturally and historically linked, in large part because the languages are mutually intelligible especially in the border regions.

Even in modern times, there have been serious talks of a Nordic Union, either within or in competition with the European Union, and a Nordic Passport Union has been in existence since 1952, allowing all citizens of the Nordic countries to travel freely without documents.

Sweden has 16 honorary consulates (in Aabenraa, Aarhus, Aalborg, Esbjerg, Frederikshavn, Grenaa, Helsingør, Holbæk, Kolding, Nuuk, Nykøbing Falster, Odense, Rønne, Skagen, Tórshavn and Viborg).

See also 
 UEFA Euro 2008 qualifier fan attack
 Denmark and Sweden football rivalry
 History of Denmark
 History of Sweden
 Kalmar Union
 Swedish Gustaf's Church
 Accession of Sweden to the European Union 
 Sweden–NATO relations

References

External links 
 Danish embassy in Stockholm (in Danish only)
 Swedish embassy in Copenhagen
 Danish-Swedish association

 

 
Sweden
Bilateral relations of Sweden